Godspell (full title is Godspell: A Musical Based on the Gospel According to St. Matthew) is a 1973 musical film. It is a film adaptation of the 1971 Off-Broadway musical Godspell (in turn based on the Gospel of Matthew), created by John-Michael Tebelak with music and lyrics by Stephen Schwartz. Directed by David Greene with stars Victor Garber (in his film debut) as Jesus and David Haskell as Judas/John the Baptist, the film is set in contemporary New York City. Tebelak is credited as co-writer of the screenplay and served as the creative consultant, although director David Greene said Tebelak did not write the screenplay.

Plot
The structure of the musical is, in large part, retained: a series of parables from the Gospel of Matthew, interspersed with musical numbers. Many of the scenes take advantage of well-known sites around an empty, still New York City. John the Baptist gathers a diverse band of youthful disciples to follow and learn from the teachings of Jesus. These disciples then proceed to form a roving acting troupe that enacts Jesus's parables through the streets of New York. They often make references to vaudeville shtick.

Cast

 Victor Garber as Jesus Christ
 Katie Hanley as Katie, a diner waitress
 David Haskell as John the Baptist and Judas Iscariot  
 Merrell Jackson as Merrell, a garment trader
 Joanne Jonas as Joanne, a ballet dancer
 Robin Lamont as Robin, a window shopper
 Gilmer McCormick as Gilmer, a model
 Jeffrey Mylett as Jeffrey, a taxi driver
 Jerry Sroka as Jerry, a parking attendant
 Lynne Thigpen as Lynne, a college student

Garber, Haskell, Jonas, Lamont, McCormick and Mylett had performed in one, or more, of the original 1970 Carnegie Mellon creation or the earliest commercial productions: 1971 Off-Broadway, 1971 Melbourne, and 1972 Toronto.

Musical numbers
 "Prepare Ye the Way of the Lord" - John the Baptist
 "Save the People" - Jesus
 "Day by Day" - Robin Lamont
 "Turn Back, O Man" - Joanne Jonas
 "Bless the Lord" - Lynne Thigpen
 "All for the Best" - Jesus, Judas
 "All Good Gifts" - Merrell Jackson 
 "Light of the World" - Jerry, Gilmer, Jeffrey, Robin
 "Alas for You" - Jesus (Tebelak voices the Pharisee Monster)
 "By My Side" - Katie
 "Beautiful City" - Company
 "Beautiful City" (Instrumental Reprise)
 "On the Willows"
 "Finale" - Jesus
 "Day by Day" (Reprise) - Company

Differences from the musical
The song "Beautiful City" was written for and first included in the film, while the songs "Learn Your Lessons Well" and "We Beseech Thee" were omitted. The melody for "Learn Your Lessons Well" is used briefly in an early scene of the film and again as incidental music, and snippets of both "Learn Your Lessons Well" and "We Beseech Thee" are heard in the scene inside Cherry Lane Theatre when Jesus plays their melodies on the piano during the story of The Prodigal Son.

While the play requires very little stage dressing, the film places emphasis on dramatic location shots in Manhattan. (Except for the opening scenes and the final scene, the city streets and parks are devoid of people other than the cast.) Locations include the following:
 The Brooklyn Bridge, where John the Baptist walks down the pedestrian walkway while humming "Prepare Ye the Way of the Lord" in the opening sequence;
 Bethesda Fountain in Central Park, in which the new disciples are baptized by John while singing "Prepare Ye";
 The Andrew Carnegie Mansion, in which they sing "Turn Back, O Man";
 Times Square, where Jesus and John are silhouetted by a screen of lights as they dance to "All For the Best";
 The central fountain at Lincoln Center, where Jesus and Judas dance on the fountain's stone lip as they sing "All for the Best";
 The top of North Tower of the World Trade Center, which was nearing completion at the time of the film's production; 
 The Soldiers' and Sailors' Monument on Riverside Drive;
 A bird's-eye view of Fifth Avenue from above and behind St. Patrick's Cathedral, looking down on the Tishman Building  during "Beautiful City";
 The exterior and interior of the Cherry Lane Theatre – where the first musical version of Godspell began its off-Broadway run the year before the film was shot – where the story of The Prodigal Son is told.
 The long approaches of the Hell Gate Bridge on Randall's Island, where the disciples switch to their colorful clothing after baptism near the start of the film, and where they carry Jesus' body through the arches, creating a barrel-vaulted cathedral effect, after his crucifixion on a chain-link fence.

Vocally, the chorus is very much in the same style, but solo parts are, at times, more lyrical. Notably, in "All Good  Gifts", whereas Lamar Alford had used a dramatic tenor voice, Merrell Jackson uses a lighter voice and falsetto for the high ornament, which creates a joyous effect.

Regarding the band, all four of the musicians from the original stage production and cast album were retained for the film recording. These musicians were Steve Reinhardt on keyboards, Jesse Cutler on acoustic and lead guitar and bass, Richard LaBonte on rhythm guitar and bass, and Ricky Shutter on drums and percussion. Reviewer William Ruhlmann explains that by having a larger budget than had been available for the stage, Schwartz was able to expand the line-up by adding key studio personnel such as lead guitarist Hugh McCracken (on "Prepare Ye (The Way of the Lord)"), keyboardist Paul Shaffer, bass player Steve Manes, a horn section, and six strings.

Ruhlmann describes Schwartz as being "better able to realize the score's pop tendencies than he had on the cast album... this was a less complete version of the score, but it was much better performed and produced, making this a rare instance in which the soundtrack album is better than the original cast album.”

Reception
The film was entered into the 1973 Cannes Film Festival.

Godspell received generally positive reviews in 1973. Allmovie Guide gives the film a three out of five rating. Various bands have covered songs from the film/musical.
On Rotten Tomatoes the film has an approval rating of 67% based on reviews from 15 critics.

The film was recognized by the American Film Institute in 2006: AFI's 100 Years...100 Cheers – Nominated.

See also
 List of American films of 1973
 Godspell (1971 Off-Broadway Cast)

References

External links
 
 
 Patches and Face Paint- A Godspell Fansite
  Godspell: From Stage to Screen
  Kelly's Godspell Playground

1973 films
1970s musical films
American musical films
1970s English-language films
Films directed by David Greene
Cultural depictions of John the Baptist
Films about Jesus
Films about Christianity
Films based on musicals
Films set in Manhattan
Films set in New York City
Films shot in New York City
Columbia Pictures films
Films based on adaptations
Cultural depictions of Judas Iscariot
Gospel of Matthew
1970s American films